María Murillo may refer to:

María Lucelly Murillo (born 1991), Colombian javelin thrower
María Murillo (footballer) (born 1996), Panamanian footballer
María Fernanda Murillo (born 1999), Colombian high jumper
María Murillo (sprinter) (born 1997), Costa Rican sprinter at the 2016 NACAC Under-23 Championships

See also
Mario Murillo